Art Townsend may refer to:
Art Townsend (ice hockey) (1902–1971), Canadian ice hockey player
Art Townsend (publisher) (1921–1989), American publisher